Joxe Austin Arrieta Ugartetxea (born 26 October 1949) is a Basque writer and translator.

Life 
Arrieta was born in Donostia, Gipuzkoa. He obtained a degree in Philosophy and Literature (Romanic Philology). From 1982 until he retired, he worked at a bank as a translator. He has been a teacher and a lecturer at the EUTG School of Languages and Philosophy. 
He has also worked in other areas of Basque culture, collaborating with associations like UZEI and UEU.

He has taken political positions in the field of culture and Basque language.

He has written poetry and narrative and has also excelled as a literary translator. His first published work was Bidaia-Termitosti (Ustela, 1978) a book of short stories. After that, in 1979, Arrieta published his first novel, Abuztuaren 15eko bazkalondoa. Among his poetry books,  (Elkar, 1989) and Graffitien ganbara (Kutxa, 1995) stand out. But Arrieta is also a renowned translator and has translated works from French, English, Catalan and German languages into Basque: the play by Marguerite Yourcenar, Memoirs of Hadrian, Lord of the flies by William Golding and Homo Faver, by Max Frisch.

Works

Narratives 
  (1978, Ustela)
  (1997, Txalaparta)

Novels 
  (1979, GAK): , 
  (1987, Elkar)
  (2008, Txalaparta)

Poetry 
  (1983, GAK)
  (1986, Elkar)
  (1989, Elkar)
  (1996, Kutxa fundazioa)
  (2001, Susa): Koldo Izagirreren edizioa
  (2003, Kutxa Fundazioa)

References 

1949 births
Living people
Basque writers
Basque-language writers